Vitrea inae is a species of small, air-breathing land snail, a terrestrial pulmonate gastropod mollusk in the family Pristilomatidae.

Distribution 
This species is endemic to Spain.

References

Pristilomatidae
Gastropods described in 1991
Endemic molluscs of the Iberian Peninsula
Endemic fauna of Spain
Taxonomy articles created by Polbot